Dalian Maple Leaf International School is a private educational system, located in Dalian, Liaoning Province. It offers courses from the primary to middle and high school levels. It is known to be the first international school established in China and it is affiliated to the educational system of British Columbia, Canada.

General
Dalian Maple Leaf International School is an educational system, located in Dalian, Liaoning Province,  from the primary to middle and high school levels. It is managed by Maple Leaf Educational Systems and Schools, with its headquarters in Dalian City.

Other Locations
-Wuhan
-Jingzhou
-Shanghai
-Tianjing
-Chongqing
-Eerduosi
-Liangping
-Hainan
-Henan
-Huaian
-Huaifang
-Huzhou
-Pingdingshan
-Pinghu
-Xian
-Yiwu
-Yancheng
-Zhengjiang

Outside China:
-Kamloops, British Columbia, Canada

The schools are:
 Primary school in Dalian Development Area, Jinzhou District, Dalian
 China’s Largest Private K-12 and Largest international school system
 British Columbia’s first and Canada’s largest offshore school system
 British Columbia’s largest employer of new teachers
 High schools inspected and accredited by AdvancED – USA government recognized and the largest school accrediting body in the world (accrediting more than 38,000 schools in more than 75 counties around the world
 Middle school in Daheishi (Lushun North Road), Dalian
 High School in Jinshitan, Jinzhou District, Dalian
 Pre-School to Grade 9 Foreign Nationals School in Xigang (Dalian), Dalian
 World’s Top Ranked universities admitting 2016 MLES graduates included Imperial College London, UCL, University of California-Berkeley, University of California-Los Angeles, McGill University, UBC, University of Toronto, University of Melbourne, Chinese University of Hong Kong, Australian National University, University of Alberta, McMaster University, and Tsinghua University
Their graduates receive the diplomas equivalent to those of the public education system in British Columbia, Canada.

See also

There are other educational opportunities for the children of the foreign assignees living in Dalian:
 Dalian Asksun School
 No. 16 Middle and High School
 Dalian American International School
 Bilingual School in Dalian Software Park (Uses the Chinese and English languages)
 Dalian Japanese School
 Dalian Korean School (KO)

External links
(English Version) Maple Leaf Education Systems  http://www.mapleleafschools.com/
(Chinese Version) 枫叶国际学校  http://www.mapleleaf.cn/
 Maple Leaf Education Group (in Chinese and English)

Education in Dalian
High schools in Dalian
International schools in China